Karl-Heinz Ferschl (born 7 July 1944 in Nuremberg) is a retired German football player. He spent nine seasons in the Bundesliga with 1. FC Nürnberg and Hertha BSC.

Honours
 Bundesliga champion: 1967–68

References

External links
 

1944 births
Living people
German footballers
Bundesliga players
1. FC Nürnberg players
Hertha BSC players
Footballers from Nuremberg
Association football midfielders